Mike Chevalier (August 14, 1943 in Los Angeles – June 12, 2006 in Hollywood Hills, Los Angeles) was an American cinematographer.  He was one of the original seven Founding Fathers of the Society of Operating Cameramen.

External links
 
 Society of Operating Cameramen

American cinematographers
1943 births
2006 deaths